The 2018–19 Jaguar I-Pace eTrophy was the inaugural season of the battery electric zero-emission international motor racing series supporting the FIA Formula E Championship, which started in December 2018 and ended in July 2019. The series saw entrants compete in a race-prepared Jaguar I-PACE, built by Jaguar's Special Vehicle Operations team with technical support from M-Sport who maintain the cars, with the races taking place on selected Formula E weekends.

Teams and drivers

Mid-season changes
 A new Austrian entry, led by Thomas Bleiner, was trying to enter championship mid-season. An entry dubbed 'Team Bleiner' was featured on a provisional entry list for the second round in Mexico City, but never actually entered the championship.
 Jaguar China Racing have been rotating multiple drivers throughout the season before ultimately sticking with the line-up of Yaqi Zhang (who competed in every race) and Ziyi Zhang.
 Stefan Rzadzinski's deal with TWR Techeetah came to end before the Berlin ePrix. A former Panasonic Jaguar Racing driver and the 2008–09 A1GP champion Adam Carroll was announced as his replacement. The team, however, completely withdrew from the following round held in New York City.

Calendar

Results and standings

Drivers' championship
Points were awarded to the top ten classified finishers in every race, and the pole position starter in each class, using the following structure:

‡ – Qualification was not held due to poor weather conditions and safety concerns. Therefore, no extra point was given for pole position.

See also
 Formula E
 Electric Production Car Series
 Electric motorsport

References

External links
 

Jaguar
Jaguar
I-Pace eTrophy
One-make series
Green racing